Ciumarna may refer to several places in Romania:

Ciumărna, a village in Românași Commune, Sălaj County
Ciumârna, a village in Vatra Moldoviței Commune, Suceava County